Francisco José Montalvo y Ambulodi Arriola y Casabant Valdespino (1754 in Havana – 1822 in Madrid) was a Spanish soldier, colonial administrator and politician. From May 30, 1813 to April 16, 1816 he was governor and captain-general of New Granada (Colombia, Panama, Venezuela and Ecuador), and from April 16, 1816 to March 9, 1818 he was viceroy of the colony. During his terms of office, New Granada was in open revolt against Spain.

Early life
Montalvo was a Criollo (a Spaniard born in America). He entered the army in Spain in his youth, served in South America and Santo Domingo, and was promoted rapidly. In 1795 he was promoted to brigadier. He was a knight of the Order of Santiago.

As governor and viceroy of New Granada
On May 30, 1813 Montalvo took office as governor (jefe político superior) and captain general of New Granada and president of the Audiencia, replacing Benito Pérez Brito. His headquarters were at Santa Marta, since the capital was in the hands of the rebels. He arrived in the Spanish brig El Borja. Since the viceregal office had been abolished by the Spanish Constitution of 1812, he did not formally have the title of viceroy until 1816, when Ferdinand VII had abolished the Constitution. He was the highest-ranking Spanish colonial administrator in the colony. In 1815 he was promoted to lieutenant general.

He offered the city of Cartagena an alliance against Simón Bolívar, but this was rejected. On February 15, 1816 he reconquered the city for the Spanish. The following February 24, on his orders, 44 patriots of Cartagena were executed. On April 9, 1816 he announced an amnesty. According to his account the Spaniards executed 7,000 patriots in the viceroyalty during the reconquest. On April 16, 1816 he was promoted to viceroy.

Later career
He was succeeded as viceroy in 1818 by Juan José de Sámano y Uribarri and returned to Spain. There he was a councilor of state until his death.

References
 A chronology of his term in office
 A brief biography 

Attribution

1754 births
1822 deaths
Viceroys of New Granada